Angelina "Lee" (Capozzellio) Scarpetti (November 3, 1927 – March 22, 2013) was an American politician and businesswoman.

Born in Faeto, Foggia, Italy, Scarpetti moved to Bridgeport, Connecticut with her family. After her marriage, Scarpetti and her husband Raymond Scarpetti started a restaurant. She was also a real estate realtor. Scarpetti also served in the Connecticut State Senate as a Republican 1984–1986, 1988–2000. She died at 85 years old in Bridgeport, Connecticut.

Notes

1927 births
2013 deaths
People from the Province of Foggia
Politicians from Bridgeport, Connecticut
Businesspeople from Bridgeport, Connecticut
Women state legislators in Connecticut
Republican Party Connecticut state senators
20th-century American businesspeople
20th-century American businesswomen
20th-century American politicians
20th-century American women politicians
21st-century American women